This is a list of countries showing  past and future population density, ranging from 1950 to 2100, as estimated by the 2017 revision of the World Population Prospects database by the United Nations Population Division. The population density equals the number of human inhabitants per square kilometer of land area.

1950-2018 

* indicates "Demographics of COUNTRY or TERRITORY" links.

2020-2100 

* indicates "Demographics of COUNTRY or TERRITORY" links.

Notes

External links 
 United Nations, Department of Economic and Social Affairs - Population Division - World Population Prospects, the 2017 Revision

Human overpopulation
past and future population density
past and future population density
past and future population density
Eurasia
Africa
Americas
Oceania